Sirsekot  is a village development committee in Syangja District in the Gandaki Zone of central Nepal. At the time of the 2011 Nepal census it had a population of 3581 people living in 792 individual households.

References

External links
UN map of the municipalities of Syangja District

Populated places in Syangja District